Manuel Lobo Antunes ComIH • GCIH • ComM (Lisbon, 27 June 1958) is a career diplomat and former politician who serves as the current Portuguese Ambassador to the United Kingdom.

Early life and education

Born on 27 June 1958 in Lisbon and in raised in a medical family, his father was a highly esteemed Professor of Neurology in Lisbon. Antunes was one of six sons, with brothers including writer António Lobo Antunes and late neurosurgeon João Lobo Antunes.

Antunes studied law at the Catholic University of Portugal, after which he studied European affairs at the same institution. Following his graduation, Antunes applied to the Portuguese Ministry of Foreign Affairs aged 25.

Early career

Antunes began his career as a diplomatic adviser to President António Ramalho Eanes in 1984.

In 1988 Antunes left Portugal to take up his first overseas posting as a secretary in the Portuguese Mission to the Hague, before being sent to Harare, Zimbabwe as a councillor.

In 1996 he moved back to Lisbon as director for Sub-Saharan African affairs, and held various other positions in the Portuguese Ministry of Foreign Affairs including diplomatic adviser to Prime Minister António Guterres in (2001–02), director general for EU affairs (2004–05), and deputy representative to the convention on the Future of Europe.

Time in government

Upon the election of the government of José Socrates in 2005, Antunes was asked to serve as Secretary of State for National Defence and Sea.

In mid-2006 it was announced that Antunes would move from the Ministry of National Defence to the Portuguese Foreign Affairs Department as Secretary of State for European Affairs, where he oversaw Portugal's presidency of the European Union, and was one of the main negotiators of the final phase of the Treaty of Lisbon.

Post government

Antunes announced in 2008 that he would leave frontline politics and revert to a diplomatic career, and was accordingly appointed as the Permanent Representative of Portugal to the European Union, a senior diplomatic post he held until 2012.

Following this post he was deployed to Rome as Ambassador to Italy for four years, before moving to London in 2016 as Portugal's Ambassador to the United Kingdom.

Personal life

Antunes is married to his wife, Maria, with whom he has five children.

He speaks English and Italian, alongside his native Portuguese.

References

Ambassadors of Portugal to the United Kingdom
Living people
Commanders of the Order of Prince Henry
Commanders of the Order of Merit (Portugal)
Ambassadors of Portugal to Italy
Grand Crosses of the Order of Prince Henry
Portuguese jurists
1958 births